Valery Borisov may refer to:
Valery Borisov (conductor), Russian conductor
Valery Borisov (politician) (born 1957), Ukrainian politician
Valeriy Borisov (born 1966), Kazakhstani race walker